"Searchin' (I Gotta Find a Man)" is a song written and produced by Ian Anthony Stephenson and recorded by British singer Hazell Dean in 1983. It became a top-ten hit on the UK Singles Chart and US Dance Club Songs chart. It was covered in 2007 by Australian girl group Young Divas.

The single was initially released in 1983 and peaked at number seventy-six in the UK Singles Chart. The song became a popular dance track, particularly so in gay clubs. After hitting the U.S. Dance charts, where it peaked at number eight, it was re-issued in the UK in 1984 and managed to reach number six in the UK Singles Chart, becoming one of her most successful singles to date. The song was later included on her album Heart First.

Charts

Year-end charts

Searchin' '97 

In 1997 Hazel Dean launched Searchin '. The remix, in turn, came from Pete Ware and was only in the UK in the charts. Nevertheless, it was also their only release in 1997.

Track listings 
CD-Maxi
 Searchin' '97 (Radio Edit) - 4:24	
 Searchin' '97 (12" Clubmix) - 5:45	
 Searchin' '97 (Powermix) - 5:06	
 Searchin' '97 (Gotta Find A Man Mix) - 5:20	
 Searchin' '97 (Who's Housin' Who Mix) - 4:05

Charts

Young Divas version 

"Searchin'" was covered by Australian girl group Young Divas for their self-titled debut album Young Divas. It was produced by George Pappetros and released as the third and final single from the album on 17 March 2007. The song peaked at number 40 on the ARIA Singles Chart. A music video for "Searchin" features the Young Divas dancing in a nightclub with men.

Track listing
CD single
 "Searchin'" – 3:33
 "Searchin'" (Pop Embassy Remix) – 6:24
 "Searchin'" (KC Baker Club Mix) – 6:05
 "Searchin'" (Radio Extended) – 5:03

Chart

References

1983 songs
1983 singles
1984 singles
1997 singles
2007 singles
Young Divas songs
Hazell Dean songs
Sony Music Australia singles